Heterodactylus is a genus of lizards in the family Gymnophthalmidae. The genus is  endemic to Brazil.

Species
The genus Heterodactylus contains the following three species which are recognized as being valid.
Heterodactylus imbricatus  - Rio de Janeiro teiid
Heterodactylus lundii  - Lund's teiid
Heterodactylus septentrionalis

References

Further reading
Boulenger GA (1885). Catalogue of the Lizards in the British Museum (Natural History). Second Edition. Volume II. ... Teiidæ ... London: Trustees of the British Museum (Natural History). (Taylor and Francis, printers). xiii + 497 pp. + Plates I-XXIV. (Genus Heterodactylus, p. 422).
Spix JB (1825). Animalia nova sive species novae lacertarum, quas in itinere per Brasiliam annis MDCCCXVII - MDCCCXX jussu et auspiciis Maximiliani Josephi I. Bavariae Regis suscepto collegit et descripsit. Munich: F.S. Hübschmann. Index (4 unnumbered pages) + 26 pp. + 30 color plates. (Heterodactylus, new genus, p. 25). (in Latin).

 
Amphibians of South America
Endemic fauna of Brazil
Lizard genera
Taxa named by Johann Baptist von Spix